The 2006 Goudstikker restitution of 202 paintings is a binding decision by the Dutch Ministry of Culture on a WWII restitution case between the heirs of Jacques Goudstikker and the agency in charge of the Dutch National art collection (called Instituut Collectie Nederland). The 202 paintings are just a fraction of the property once owned by Goudstikker that was seized during the German occupation in 1940. After post-war discovery in Germany of much of the collection, it was returned to the Dutch State by the Monuments Men but despite repeated attempts by Goudstikker's widow, never given back to the heirs. To finance further recovery activities through provenance research, much of the 2006 group of paintings have since been sold by the Goudstikker heirs, and a few were bought back by the Dutch State. See Jacques Goudstikker for more information about his collection.

References
 Official list of 202 paintings
 Goudstikker Advice of the Restitution Committee
 Black book owned by Goudstikker with notes about paintings bought and sold, archive object in the Amsterdam city archives
Art and cultural repatriation after World War II